The Commission for Railway Regulation (CRR) (CRI), formerly the Railway Safety Commission (CSI) is an agency of the Republic of Ireland government. Its head office is in Temple House in Blackrock.

The CRR regulates Irish rail networks. The agency was established on 1 January 2006 as part of the Railway Safety Act 2005.

The Railway Accident Investigation Unit (RAIU), a functionally independent unit of the CRR, investigates accidents and incidents on Irish railways.

The RSC became the Commission for Railway Regulation (CRR) on 29 February 2016 following its designation as a regulatory body under EU law.

References

External links

 

Rail transport in the Republic of Ireland
Government agencies of the Republic of Ireland
2006 establishments in Ireland
Government agencies established in 2006
Rail transport organizations